Miss Bumbum is an annual beauty pageant held in Brazil to reward the owner of the best buttocks in the country. Created by journalist and entrepreneur Cacau Oliver, the competition has 27 contestants, each of whom represents one of the country's 27 states. The winner receives 50,000 Brazilian reais (about US$22,000) in endorsement deals, and instantly becomes a celebrity in Brazil. Brazilian television network RedeTV! broadcasts the event. The reigning title holder is Lunna LeBlanc.

Miss Bumbum made its first foray into the US market by licensing an official 2017 calendar for distribution in the US. The calendar was published in December 2016, featuring the 2016 winner Erika Canela on the cover.

Winners 
 2021: Lunna LeBlanc
 2020: Lu Duarte
2018: Ellen Santana
 2017: Rosie Oliveira
 2016: Erika Canela
 2015: Suzy Cortez
 2014: Indianara Carvalho
 2013: Dai Macedo
 2012: Carine Felizardo
 2011: Rosana Ferreira

Other notable contestants
Andressa Urach – model
 Claudia Alende – model

Controversies 
In October 2013, according to the International Business Times, models Mari Sousa (25) and Eliana Amaral (24) were accused of paying the equivalent of thousands of US dollars in bribes to the judges of the contest.

In 2018, two trans women became contestants for Miss Bumbum, the first such women to do so. Several of the other contestants objected to the inclusion of trans women in the contest. The 2018 contest was also marred by a losing contestant, Aline Uva, accusing her opposition of having surgically augmented buttocks and causing a ruckus onstage.

Similar contests
Miss Bumbum Brazil has led to the spin-off competitions Miss Bumbum World, the Fitness Angel Show in Japan and one for the FIFA World Cup in soccer. Miss Reef, held in Chile and various other South American countries, and Got Ass, held in North America, are similar competitions engaged in judging which women have the best buttocks.

Cultural context 
In Brazilian slang, bumbum is a term used for a woman's buttocks, which are considered an important element of physical beauty in Brazilian culture. An appreciation of well-shaped and sizeable female buttocks is common and widespread in Brazil and the traditional Brazilian preference is for women to have large round buttocks, the Brazilian ideal being much wider, thicker and shapelier than may often be associated with the European ideal. In 2014, more than 50,000 buttock implant procedures were performed in Brazil, compared to 19,000 in the United States. The popularity of the Miss Bumbum contest in Brazil in 2014 led to online voting for the winner exceeding 2 million votes.

See also
 Awoulaba
 Cultural history of the buttocks
 Rear of the Year
 Swimsuit competition

References

Further reading

External links 

 
 bumbumcalendar.com - Official Calendar website
 

Beauty pageants in Brazil
Brazilian awards
Buttocks
Television controversies in Brazil